Gino Giugni (1 August 1927 – 5 October 2009) was an Italian academic and politician. He served as the minister of labor and social security in the period 1993–1994.

Early life and education
Giugni was born in Genoa on 1 August 1927. He graduated from the University of Genoa in 1949 receiving a degree in law.

Career
Giugni was an expert on labour law. He began his career as a professor at the University of Bari. In 1968 he and Tiziano Treu founded the Italian Industrial Relations Research Association. Giugni became the head of the national commission charged with drafting the workers' statute that passed in 1970. He served as the director of the legislative office of the ministry of labour in the early 1980s. He also contributed to the economic agreement dated 22 January 1983. The same year he became a member of the Italian senate, being a representative of the Italian Socialist Party. He was reelected to the senate in 1987.

From April 1993 to May 1994 Giugni served as the minister of labor and social security in the cabinet led by Prime Minister Carlo Azeglio Ciampi. From 1994 to 1996 he was a member of the Italian parliament for the Progressive Left. Following his retirement from politics he returned to his teaching post and taught labor law-related courses at Sapienza University of Rome and at LUISS. He also taught at the various universities, including Nanterre University, Paris University, UCLA, Buenos Aires University and Columbia University. He served as the president of the Italian Association of Labour Law and Safety. He was also a member of the Academy of Europe. He published articles in the Italian daily La Repubblica and the monthly Il Mulino.

Works
Giugni was one of the leading Italian scholars who developed connections between labor relations and sociology. He is the author of several books, including the following: Introduzione allo studio dell'autonomia collettiva (1960), Il sindacato fra contratti e riforme (1972), Lavoro, legge, contratti (1989) and L'intervista Fondata sul lavoro? (1994).

Assassination attempt
Giugni was wounded in legs in an attack in Rome on 3 May 1983 when he was teaching at the university and serving as the director at the ministry of labor. The attack occurred after Giugni left his office at the university. Perpetrators, one man and a woman, have not been identified and arrested. A group linked to the Red Brigades claimed the responsibility of the attack.

Death
Giugni died in Rome on 5 October 2009 after long illness. He was 82.

References

External links

20th-century Italian jurists
1927 births
2009 deaths
Italian Socialist Party politicians
Democrats of the Left politicians
Italian Democratic Socialists politicians
Democratic Party (Italy) politicians
Italian Ministers of Labour
Senators of Legislature IX of Italy
Senators of Legislature X of Italy
Senators of Legislature XI of Italy
Deputies of Legislature XII of Italy
Politicians of Liguria
Politicians from Genoa
Academic staff of the University of Bari
Academic staff of the Sapienza University of Rome
Survivors of terrorist attacks
University of Genoa alumni